Dunja Ilić (born 10 September 1991) is a Serbian gothic folk singer, songwriter, composer, author and columnist.

Discography

Studio albums
 2010 – Misterija
 2011 – Živim na ivici
 2013 – Gladna tvoje ljubavi

Non-album singles
 2006 – Ubićeš me ti (Published in 2011)
 2012 – Noć je zvezdana
 2014 – Nije me ubilo
 2014 – Milion promila (feat. Dimitri)
 2015 – Oči ledene
 2019 – Da li je to ljubav ili strast (feat. Stefan Dragojlović)

Personal life
Dunja Ilić was born on September 10, 1991 in Belgrade. She was born in a very rich family. She grew up in a villa in Dedinje (in Belgrade).
Even as a little girl, she had the desire to be a singer and to be involved in music.
She appeared on the music scene in 2009 and retired in 2015, 2 years later after her father went bankrupt.
Today, she is engaged in tarot reading, and currently lives in Banja Luka.

Career

2006-2010: Career beginnings

At 18 years old, in 2009 Ilić recorded her first single "Bidermajer" and soon after that her first studio album Misterija. Both the single and the album, as well as the music video, were full of morbidities that the audience did not understand in the right way at the time.

The album Misterija was released in March 2010 by the publishing house FM Sound Production; 26,000 copies were printed.

2010-2011: Two hit singles and second studio album

In June 2010, Ilić recorded the summer single "Šefica podzemlja", which was her biggest hit in her career. In November of the same year, she released the single "Nisam laka, maco!".

The album Živim na ivici was released in May 2011 and is considered Ilić's most successful project. It was the first visual album in the Balkans. High-budget videos were recorded, which were declared the best and most expensive videos ever in this region.

2012-2013: Hit single and third studio album

In 2012, Ilić recorded the hit single "Noć je zvezdana", which was also recorded with a high-budget music video.
Ilić’s third and last studio album, Gladna tvoje ljubavi was released in July 2013, in which Dunja said goodbye to her fans.

References

External links
 
 
 
 

1991 births
Living people
Singers from Belgrade
21st-century Serbian women singers
Serbian pop singers